A bouncer is a security guard employed by a nightclub or similar establishment to prevent troublemakers from entering or to eject them from the premises

Bouncer(s) or The Bouncer may also refer to:

Art, entertainment, and media

Comics
 Bouncer (Fox Feature Syndicate), a Golden Age character and comic book series
 Bouncer (Les Humanoïdes Associés), a Western comics series by  François Boucq and Alejandro Jodorowsky
 Bouncer (DC Comics), a DC Comics character and twice a foe of Batman
 Bouncer (Marvel Comics), a Marvel Comics character and member of the Morlocks

Fictional entities
 Bouncer (Big Daddy), a type of enemy in the video game Bioshock (2007) and its sequel Bioshock 2
 Bouncer (Fox Feature Syndicate), a comic book superhero
 Bouncer (Neighbours), a dog in the Australian soap opera Neighbours
 Bouncer 2, a dog in the Australian soap opera Neighbours
 Bouncer, a type of fictional creature in the novel Red Planet by Robert A. Heinlein
 Bouncer, a Morlock in the Marvel Comics universe
 Bouncer, the giant of Tech in Skylanders: Giants
 Bouncers (Star Wars), an alien race in the fictional Star Wars universe

Literature
 Bouncers (1977), a play by the English dramatist John Godber

Music
 The Bouncer (album), a 2011 album by jazz pianist Cedar Walton
 "The Bouncer" (song), a 1992 song by Kicks Like a Mule
 "The Bouncer", a 1983 song by Electric Light Orchestra as the B-side to the 12" single "Four Little Diamonds"

Film and television
 Infinite bounce or bouncer, a quiz show format
 The Bouncer (film), a 2018 French action thriller film

Video games
 The Bouncer (video game), a PlayStation 2 fighting video game
 Bouncer, the name of a Tech-element character from Skylanders: Giants

Sports
 Bouncer (cricket), a type of delivery in cricket
 Bouncers (slamball team), an American SlamBall team
 Space hopper or bouncer, a sports toy

Technology
 Bouncer (software) or BNC, a piece of software used to relay traffic and connections in computer networks
 a reflector (photography) used for bounce lighting
 a system designed to prevent malware from being released via Google Play